Ryan Michael Blaney (born December 31, 1993) is an American professional stock car racing driver. He competes full-time in the NASCAR Cup Series, driving the No. 12 Ford Mustang for Team Penske. He is the son of former NASCAR driver Dave Blaney and the grandson of modified dirt track legend Lou Blaney.

Racing career

Early career

A third-generation racer and son of then-Cup Series driver Dave Blaney, Blaney started his racing career in quarter midget racing, winning his first race at age 9; he also competed, and won, in Bandolero cars at a young age. Moving up to Legends cars at age 12, Blaney won the Lowe's Motor Speedway Young Lion's Winter Heat Point Championship, as well as in three divisions of the Carolina Fall Nationals in quarter midgets.

At age 14, Blaney debuted in late model racing at Orange County Speedway, while in 2009, at age 15, he began competing in the Pro All Stars Series (PASS)-sanctioned South Super Late Model Series, finishing second in points and winning the series' Rookie of the Year award; he finished third in the PASS national points as well. In addition, he won the Eastern Grand Nationals quarter midget event in Huntsville, Alabama.
Continuing to compete in the PASS South Super Late Model Series in 2010, Blaney scored his first career win in the series at Dillon Motor Speedway, adding wins at Greenville-Pickens Speedway and Newport Speedway on his way to a second consecutive second-place finish in the PASS South championship standings. Blaney also competed in the Champion Racing Association (CRA)-sanctioned Southern Six Pack series, winning the series championship for 2010.
Returning to the PASS South Super Late Model Series in 2011, Blaney won two races in the series, at Dillon Motor Speedway and Ace Speedway, winning the series championship. He also made his debuts in the ARCA Racing Series and NASCAR K&N Pro Series West and East in 2011, scoring top ten finishes in every start in the three series; he won his first career NASCAR race in the K&N Pro Series West season finale at Phoenix International Raceway winning by over two seconds in his only series start.

For 2012, Blaney, who had won praise from Tony Stewart and Kevin Harvick for his driving skills, returned to the K&N Pro Series East, running six races for family-owned DB Racing, driving the No. 10, as well as to the PASS Super Late Model Series in the Carswell Motorsports No. 98.

NASCAR

Xfinity and Trucks (2012–2015)
In addition, Blaney signed with Tommy Baldwin Racing to compete in six NASCAR Nationwide Series races, driving the No. 36 SealWrap-sponsored Chevrolet, starting at Richmond International Raceway in April. Blaney qualified in the Top 10 in his debut at Richmond International Raceway, and finished seventh in the race.

In July 2012, Blaney announced that he had signed a contract to drive for Team Penske a minimum of three races in the 2012 Nationwide Series season, starting at Iowa Speedway in August. He also ran selected races in the Camping World Truck Series for Brad Keselowski Racing, finishing sixth in his debut in the series at Bristol Motor Speedway. Blaney won his first career Truck Series race on September 15, 2012, at Iowa Speedway; at the time, he was the youngest winner in Truck Series history at 18 years, eight months, and 15 days. The previous record was 20 years and 18 days set by Kyle Busch in 2005.Blaney returned to the Camping World Truck Series in 2013, driving the full schedule for Brad Keselowski Racing and competing for the series' Rookie of the Year award. Blaney won his first career pole in the series at Kentucky Speedway in June, then won his second career Truck Series race at Pocono Raceway in August. Blaney also competed in the Nationwide Series at Iowa Speedway in June, substituting for Joey Logano after a rainout created a schedule conflict; Blaney finished ninth in the event. Blaney competed in a second Nationwide Series race in 2013, at Kentucky Speedway on September 21, and led 96 of the race's 200 laps to win his first career race in the series, beating Austin Dillon and Matt Crafton. Blaney was the only race winner in the 2013 Nationwide season to not have any Sprint Cup experience.

In January 2014, Blaney announced that in addition to a full Camping World Truck Series schedule with BKR, he would be running 15 Nationwide Series and two Sprint Cup Series races for Team Penske during the year. He made his debut at Kansas Speedway, finishing 27th. In August, it was announced that Blaney would be running in the Nationwide Series for Penske in 2015, and would also run twenty Sprint Cup Series races for Wood Brothers Racing in the No. 21 Ford during the 2015 NASCAR Sprint Cup Series season.

Blaney drove the No. 29 truck full-time for Brad Keselowski Racing. He had many Top 10 but failed to win in the spring. However his year's turning point was at Dover in late May 2014, when he came up short to Kyle Busch who beat him by 0.5 (one car length) seconds for the win. After the race, Blaney was one of the drivers who said that because Kyle was winning a lot in the truck series, that the Cup series drivers should no longer race in any division besides the Cup series.

Blaney won his second career Nationwide race in August 2014 at Bristol Motor Speedway, beating Kyle Busch in a green-white-checkered finish. The next week, Blaney won his first Truck race of 2014 spectacularly at Ron Fellows' own Canadian Tire Motorsports Park raceway, edging German Quiroga by 0.49 seconds in a photo-finish.

In 2015, Blaney began his Xfinity Series schedule at Las Vegas in the Boyd Gaming 300. After leading two laps, he was briefly in contention for the win. After spinning out fellow driver Erik Jones late in the race, Blaney restarted the final restart in eighth place. Despite this, he drove from eighth to second in the final 21 laps. Though he caught up to race leader Austin Dillon with three laps to go, Blaney was unable to force his way by Dillon. Blaney finished second to Dillon by a three-car-length winning difference.

In the Cup Series, Blaney performed well for a rookie in the No. 21 for the Wood Brothers team. He picked up his first Top 10 at Talladega in the GEICO 500, running as high as second and finishing 4th. He didn't qualify for three races due to rainouts. He nearly won at Indianapolis Motor Speedway in the Xfinity race, finishing second to Kyle Busch after being passed on the final lap. He won at Iowa and nearly won at Road America in his debut at the track. He again won at the Kentucky standalone race in September beating Ty Dillon on a late-race restart. Blaney got his second top 10 of his career in Sprint Cup at Kansas for the Hollywood Casino 400 finishing seventh.

Full-time Cup (2016–present)

Wood Brothers Racing (2016–2017)

Blaney began competing full-time in the Cup Series in 2016 with the Wood Brothers despite the Wood Brothers being excluded from NASCAR's new Charter system implemented before the 2016 Cup series season. He got his third Top 10 of his career in Sprint Cup, finishing 6th in the Kobalt 400 at Las Vegas. Blaney picked up more top tens at Phoenix, Talladega, Kansas, Dover, and Pocono for a so-far successful half of the season with his best finish being a 5th at Kansas. Before the race at Auto Club Speedway, Blaney and close friend Darrell Wallace Jr. drove together from Phoenix to Fontana and stole the headlines one evening when they took over NASCAR's Snapchat and filmed themselves mimicking drivers such as Carl Edwards. At Chicagoland, Blaney ran well all day and for the final restart, he gambled and stayed out, and got the race lead. However, on the restart Martin Truex Jr. would get past him easily due to having fresher tires and would go on to get the win, and Blaney would finish 4th.

In 2017, fellow single-car team Go Fas Racing announced that they would loan their charter to the No. 21 Wood Brothers team, guaranteeing Blaney a spot in every race of the 2017 season. During the Daytona 500, Blaney, despite being caught up in an early wreck, charged from 5th on the final lap to place second to Kurt Busch. Ryan Blaney had a better race in April at Texas Motor Speedway. He qualified second to Kevin Harvick. He then passed Harvick early in the race to lead the next 148 laps. However, a late-race pit stop error cost Blaney the race. He recovered from his mishap and finished 12th. At Kansas, Blaney won his first career Cup Series pole. The race was primarily a duel between him and Martin Truex Jr. After battling Truex for 3 restarts, Truex pulled away to win the race while Blaney finished fourth.

In June, he won his first career Cup race at the Axalta presents the Pocono 400 at Pocono Raceway. After passing Kyle Busch with 10 laps to go, he held off Kevin Harvick to claim the victory, qualifying him for the playoffs. On July 26, Blaney announced he would be moving to Team Penske's No. 12 car for the 2018 season; Paul Menard was signed to take over the No. 21 car. At the end of the regular season, Blaney entered the playoffs as the ninth seed, courtesy of his win at Pocono and three stage wins. During his playoff run, Blaney made it into the Round of 8, highlighted by a third-place finish in the Round of 12 finale at Kansas, despite having to start last and at the rear of the field after his car failed post-qualifying inspection. Blaney then scored consecutive top-ten finishes at Martinsville and Texas, but despite winning the pole for the Round of 8 finale at Phoenix, he faded outside of the top ten by the end of stage one. He rebounded to secure eighth by the end of stage two, but could not improve his standing on the track, ultimately finishing the race in 17th and being eliminated from the playoffs. Blaney wound up finishing 29th in the season finale at Homestead-Miami Speedway, securing a ninth-place finish in the final Cup Series standings with his one win, four top fives, 14 top tens, four stage wins, and two poles. His ninth-place points finish was also the highest for a driver for the Wood Brothers since Morgan Shepherd finished sixth in the final Cup standings in 1994.

Team Penske (2018–present)

For his tenure at Team Penske, it was announced that Penske would enter a primary sponsorship deal with John Menard Jr. and Menards, which sponsors the team's IndyCar operations. Blaney made the Playoffs with five top-fives and 12 top-10s in the regular season. He scored his first win with Team Penske in the Bank of America Roval 400 at the Charlotte Roval after leaders Martin Truex Jr. and Jimmie Johnson wrecked going into the chicane. The win advanced him to the Round of 12 Playoffs. Blaney was eliminated from the Round of 12 after the fall Kansas race and finished the season 10th in points.

Blaney remained consistent within the top 10 in points in 2019. At Watkins Glen, he spun Jimmie Johnson out of contention, leading to an argument between the two after the race. The animosity between them lasted until Michigan a week later. At the Charlotte Roval, Blaney finished eighth to advance to the Round of 12. Blaney won the Talladega fall race in a photo finish of 0.007 seconds over Ryan Newman and advanced into the Round of 8, despite an early spin onto pit road. Despite finishing third at Phoenix, he was eliminated in the Round of 8.

Blaney lost the 2020 Daytona 500 to Denny Hamlin in the second-closest finish in Daytona 500 history. At the GEICO 500, he recorded his fourth Cup win, defeating Ricky Stenhouse Jr. by 0.007. He had transmission issues at the 2020 Quaker State 400, forcing him to drive through the turns one-handed because his car kept jumping out of fourth gear. Nonetheless, he held the lead for a small part of the final lap but hit a drain on the apron, finishing sixth. Blaney made the playoffs with his win at Talladega, but was eliminated in the Round of 16 following the Bristol Night Race.

During the 2021 season, Blaney won at Atlanta and Michigan, scoring his fifth and sixth career wins in the series respectively. The Atlanta win was emotional for Blaney as it came 20 years after his dad almost won the same race, only to lose because of a broken wheel. For the first time in his career, Blaney had back-to-back wins after he won the last race of the regular season at Daytona International Speedway the following week. Both wins gave him his sixth and his seventh career wins. After only winning four races in the five seasons before 2021, Blaney captured three wins in the cup Series regular season. He went into the 2021 Cup playoffs as the second-seeded driver with three wins on the season behind Kyle Larson, who had five wins. Blaney made it to the Round of 8 before being eliminated after Martinsville. He finished the season seventh in the points standings.

Blaney started the 2022 season with a fourth-place finish at the 2022 Daytona 500. Despite scoring no wins in the first 13 races, he stayed consistent with four top-fives and six top-10 finishes. He also won the 2022 NASCAR All-Star Race. Despite being involved in a multi-car crash on lap 31 of the regular season finale at the Daytona night race, Blaney rallied to finish 15th to clinch the 16th and final Playoff spot of the season, beating Martin Truex Jr. by three points. Blaney was eliminated following the Round of 8 after finishing third at Martinsville. Despite being winless, he finished the season eighth in the points standings.

In media

In 2017, Blaney voiced Ryan "Inside" Laney in the Pixar film Cars 3.

At the beginning of the 2017 season, Blaney began a NASCAR-supported podcast featuring former Miss Sprint Cup and current Motor Racing Network personality Kim Coon and NASCAR.com analyst Chuck Bush, called the Glass Case of Emotion podcast.

In June 2017, Blaney became a member of Fox NASCAR Cup driver-only broadcast team for the Xfinity Series race at Pocono Raceway, working as a pit reporter alongside Erik Jones and Ricky Stenhouse Jr. He also interviewed race-winner Brad Keselowski; the next day, the roles were reversed as he won his first Cup race with Keselowski, still in his firesuit, interviewing him. The driver-only broadcast format returned for the 2018 Xfinity race at Talladega Superspeedway as Blaney returned to his pit duties.

Blaney had a cameo appearance as a delivery boy in the 2017 film Logan Lucky.

Blaney guest-starred in the TV show Taken in season 2 episode 12 "Imperium", as Special Agent Nathan Wood; the episode aired on April 20, 2018.

Blaney had a cameo appearance as himself in the Netflix's television series The Crew.

Personal life
Blaney is the only son and middle child of Lisa and Dave Blaney. He has two sisters: Emma and Erin; Emma is married to driver Cale Conley. Blaney is of Irish descent. He is a close friend of fellow drivers and competitors Bubba Wallace, Erik Jones, and Chase Elliott, and an avid Star Wars fan.

Blaney has multiple tattoos, including a Star Wars inspired piece on his right leg, a sprint car on his left side, and the #10 in red on the left side of his chest in tribute to the number he ran most often growing up.

Motorsports career results

NASCAR
(key) (Bold – Pole position awarded by qualifying time. Italics – Pole position earned by points standings or practice time. * – Most laps led.)

Cup Series

Daytona 500

Xfinity Series

Camping World Truck Series

K&N Pro Series East

K&N Pro Series West

Whelen Modified Tour

 Season still in progress
 Ineligible for series points
 In 2012 Blaney switched from Nationwide to Truck Series points at Atlanta Motor Speedway in August.

ARCA Racing Series
(key) (Bold – Pole position awarded by qualifying time. Italics – Pole position earned by points standings or practice time. * – Most laps led.)

Superstar Racing Experience
(key) * – Most laps led. 1 – Heat 1 winner. 2 – Heat 2 winner.

References
Notes

Citations

External links

 
 Official profile at Bodyarmor SuperDrink
 

Living people
1993 births
Sportspeople from High Point, North Carolina
Racing drivers from North Carolina
NASCAR drivers
ARCA Menards Series drivers
People from Trumbull County, Ohio
Team Penske drivers